Golrang Industrial Group also known as GIG consists of nearly 100 subsidiaries, operating in regional, national and international levels, and in diverse fields of business, including: Hygiene and detergent, food industries, pharmaceutical industries, cellulose industry, distribution and sales, cosmetics, automotive industry, oil and gas, petrochemical, mine, energy, construction, international trading services, printing and packaging, insurance services, transportation, manufacturing polymer and plastic products, education services, information technology, industrial kitchen equipment. At present, more than 50,000 employees are working in Golrang Industrial Group.

Brands
Golrang Industrial Group owns dozens of famous brands in numerous fields of active industries in various fields of economy. Brands such as: Golrang, Avé, Softlan, Oila, Famila, Active, Suntin Barlie, Nancy, Home plus, Merci, Merident, Goldent...

Product Categories
Production of more than 60 product categories with annual sales, exceeding 1 billion product units, the growth rate of more than three times higher than of the industry, within the past 20 years, investment of more than 400 billion rials in order to equip and develop research laboratories, and many other items are among the capabilities of Golrang Industrial Group.

List of Golrang Holding Companies
 Golrang
Hasti Aryan Tamin
Pakshoo
GPA (Gol Pakhsh e Aval)
Hyper Famili Chain Stores
MSCI (Marina Sun Cellulose Industrial) 
Golrang Pakhsh
Padideh Shimi Nili 
Padideh Shimi Paydar
Anitasun Industrial Group
Ofogh Koorosh Chain Stores 
Kourosh Dried Fruits & Legumes Industry (KBI)
ATS (Aryan Tejarat Shargh)
ASP (Aryan System Pardaz) 
Tiyan Gas Steel Industrial 
MasterFoodeh Food Industry
Aryan System Pardaz
Golbarg Baharan
Pakan Pelastkar 
Pakhshe Padideh Paydar(Active)
Golrang Pharmaceutical Investment Group
Hasti Aria Shimi Co. P.J.S.
Arian Salamat Sina Co. P.J.S
Hasti Arian Darou Co. P.J.S.
Salamat Pakhshe Hasti co. P.
Golrang University
Golrang Media Institute (GMI)
Golrang Electronics Industries (GEI)
Aryan Sanaat Rafie (ASR)
Golrang Motor Family (GMF)
Tejarat Electronic Kourosh (TEK)
Koorosh Protein Company (KPC)

Subsidiary companies
The GIG's subsidiaries are as follows:

See also
Industry of Iran
Industrial Development and Renovation Organization of Iran

References 

Conglomerate companies of Iran
Conglomerate companies established in 1960
Iranian brands
Companies based in Tehran